Give Me Liberty is a 1936 American drama short or historical "special" filmed in Technicolor, produced and distributed by  Warner Bros., and directed by B. Reeves Eason. The short covers a short period of time in the life of Patrick Henry, leading to his speech before the Second Virginia Convention in 1775. The film won an Academy Award at the 9th Academy Awards for Best Short Subject (Color) of 1936.

Cast

 John Litel as Patrick Henry
 Nedda Harrigan as Doxie Henry
 Carlyle Moore Jr. as Captain Milton
 Robert Warwick as George Washington
 George Irving as Thomas Jefferson
 Boyd Irwin as British Commissioner
 Gordon Hart as Anti-Rebel Delegate Speaker
 Myrtle Stedman as Martha Washington
 Shirley Lloyd as Party Guest Giving Patrick a Violin
 Ted Osborne as Randolph Peyton (as Theodore Osborne)
 Carrie Daumery as Party Guest
 Jesse Graves as Moses (Washington's servant)
 Wade Lane as Judge
 Charles Frederick Lindsley as Narrator
 Wilfred Lucas as His Excellency, permitting Henry's arrest
 Jack Mower as Gentleman
 Bancroft Owen as Tom
 Paul Panzer as Man with fur hat
 Sam Rice as Convention delegate extra
 John J. Richardson as Man kneeling to trip the Commissioner
 Cyril Ring as Delegate shouting "Treason! Treason!"
 Lottie Williams as Party guest at the Henrys'
 William Worthington as Pendleton

References

External links

1936 drama films
1936 films
American drama short films
Cultural depictions of George Washington
Cultural depictions of Thomas Jefferson
Films directed by B. Reeves Eason
Live Action Short Film Academy Award winners
Vitaphone short films
Warner Bros. short films
Cultural depictions of Patrick Henry
1930s English-language films
1930s American films
Cultural depictions of Martha Washington